The Renewable Energy Certificates Registry (REC-registry) is an internet-based registry system in Australia for renewable energy certificates (RECs).  If an Australian organization installs a green energy installation (solar energy, wind energy, etc.), they can apply for RECs to offset consumption of fossil fuels.

The REC-registry was established by the Australian Renewable Energy (Electricity) Act 2000 (the Act), and is maintained by the Clean Energy Regulator.

The REC-registry:
 facilitates the creation, registration, transfer and surrender of large-scale generation certificates (LGCs) and  small-scale technology certificates (STCs)],
 tracks the ownership and status of all certificates,
 provides access to the STC clearing house, and
 maintains various public registers as required by the Act.

Prior to 1 January 2011, the primary mechanism in the renewable energy target (RET) was the renewable energy certificate (REC). From 1 January 2011 RECs were split into small-scale technology certificates (STCs) and large-scale generation certificates (LGCs). RECs are still used as a general term covering both STCs and LGCs. 

All certificates must be created in the REC-registry before they can be bought, sold, traded or surrendered. Participants must hold an account and be registered as a REC-registry user to create, view or transfer certificates.

References

External links
 REC Registry Web Site
 ORER Web site

Renewable energy in Australia
Renewable energy certification